You Can't Stop Destiny is the second studio album by American rapper Papoose. It was released on July 17, 2015 through Honorable Records with distribution via INgrooves. Production was handled by DJ Tip, G.U.N. Productions, Ron Browz, Antwan "Amadeus" Thompson, DJ Premier, Gemcrates, Havoc and Showbiz. The album features guest appearances from A.G., Maino, Red Café, Remy Ma, Troy Ave and Ty Dolla $ign.

Track listing

References

2015 albums
Papoose (rapper) albums
Albums produced by Ron Browz
Albums produced by DJ Premier
Albums produced by Havoc (musician)
Albums produced by Showbiz (producer)